Change Your World is a 1992 album by Contemporary Christian music artist Michael W. Smith.

Track listing

Personnel 
 Michael W. Smith – lead vocals, keyboards (1–3, 5, 6, 8, 9, 11), Fender Rhodes (4), synthesizer (7), acoustic piano (7)
 Mark Heimmerman – additional keyboards (1, 2, 5, 6, 8, 9), drum programming (1, 4, 6, 10), backing vocals (2, 3, 8–11), keyboards (10)
 Brian Tankersley – additional programming (1, 6), drum programming (9)
 Mike Lawler – additional keyboards (2, 3, 9, 10)
 Phil Madeira – Hammond B3 organ (4, 6, 9)
 Scott McLeod – synthesizer (7), synth bass (7), drum programming (7)
 Trace Scarborough – synthesizer (7), synth bass (7), drum programming (7)
 Dann Huff – guitar (1, 3, 4, 6, 7, 9, 11)
 George Cocchini – guitar (1, 10)
 Jerry McPherson – guitar (2, 5, 7, 8, 9)
 Jackie Street – bass (1, 6, 7, 8, 10)
 Jimmie Lee Sloas – bass (2, 9)
 Gary Lunn – bass (3, 5, 11)
 Tommy Sims – bass (4)
 Joe Houge – drum programming (2)
 Mark Hammond – drum programming (3, 11)
 Steve Brewster – drums (4, 5, 8)
 Toby McKeehan – drum programming (4, 10), vocal flavor (10)
 Terry McMillan – percussion (1, 3, 6, 9, 11)
 Dan Higgins – saxophones (4)
 Barry Green – trombone (3, 6)
 Chris McDonald – trombone (3, 6), horn arrangements (3, 6)
 Bill Reichenbach, Jr. – trombone (4)
 Mike Haynes – trumpet (3, 6)
 George Tidwell – trumpet (3, 6)
 Gary Grant – trumpet (4)
 Jerry Hey – trumpet (4), horn arrangements (4)
 The Nashville String Machine – strings (3, 5, 6, 8, 9, 11)
 Ronn Huff – string arrangements and conductor (3, 5, 6, 8, 9, 11)
 Michael Black – backing vocals (1–4, 7–10)
 Vicki Hampton – backing vocals (1, 2)
 Donna McElroy – backing vocals (1, 2, 7, 10)
 Chris Rodriguez – backing vocals (1, 2, 4, 7, 11)
 Chris Harris – backing vocals (2, 3, 8–11), 
 Wayne Kirkpatrick – backing vocals (2, 3, 11)
 Chris Willis – backing vocals (4)
 The Music City Mass Choir – choir (4)
 Amy Grant – lead vocals (5)
 Greg Barnhill – backing vocals (6)
 Bob Carlisle – backing vocals (6)
 Joey Jelf – backing vocals (6)
 Carl Lucero – backing vocals  (7)
 Angelo Petrucci – backing vocals (7)
 Veronica Petrucci – backing vocals (7)
 Lisa Bevill – backing vocals (9)
 Ricky D – backing vocals (9)
 Jan Harris – backing vocals (9)
 Bonnie Keen – backing vocals (9)
 Kevin Max Smith – backing vocals (9)
 Kim Smith – backing vocals (9)
 Michael Tait – backing vocals (9)
 The Christ Church Choir – choir (9)

Production 
 Producers – Mark Heimmerman and Michael W. Smith
 Executive Producer – Michael Blanton
 John Kalodner – John Kalodner
 Vocal Production – Wayne Kirkpatrick
 Additional production on "Out of This World" – Trace Scarborough and Scott McLeod
 Engineered by JB
 Additional Engineers – Keith Compton, Lynn Fuston, Humberto Gatica, Patrick Kelly, Brent King, Bryan Lenox, Alejandro Rodriguez, Tony Sheppard, Penn Singleton, Brian Tankersley and Bill Warner.
 Assistant Engineers – Jeff Baggett, Mark Capps, David Hall, Keith Kregsi, David Murphy, Greg Parker, Darren Smith, Aaron Swihart and Martin Woodlee.
 Strings recorded by JB and Brent King
 Horns on "Color Blind" recorded by Humberto Gatica
 Recorded at Deer Valley and Classic Recording Studio (Franklin, TN); The Benson Company, Javelina Recording Studios, The Master's Touch, Skylab Recording, Soundshop Recording, OmniSound and Quad Studios (Nashville, TN); Devonshire Studios (North Hollywood, CA).
 Mixed by Humberto Gatica
 Mix Assistant – Alejandro Rodriguez
 Mixed at Sixteenth Avenue Sound (Nashville, TN), Emerald Sound (Nashville, TN) and Ground Control (Santa Monica, CA).
 Mastered by Greg Fulginiti at Masterdisk (New York, NY).
 Mastering Supervisor – David Donnelly
 Creative Direction – Robin Sloane
 Art Direction – Janet Wolsborn
 Photography – Timothy White
 Photography Coordination – Sofie Howard

Chart performance

References 

Michael W. Smith albums
1992 albums
Reunion Records albums